The Vigilantes Return is a 1947 Western film directed by Ray Taylor. Produced by Universal Pictures in Cinecolor, it was shot in Iverson Ranch in Chatsworth, Los Angeles, California.

Plot
Marshal Johnnie Taggart, posing as an outlaw named "Ace" Braddock, comes to Bannack, Montana to restore law and order. But he is recognized by Kitty, co-owner with Clay Curtwright, of the infamous Bull Whip saloon. But "bad-girl" Kitty keeps her mouth shut. When Johnnie's pal Andy reports a stage holdup, Curtwright's henchman, Ben Borden, talks the sheriff and Judge Holden into suspecting Johnnie. Johnnie reveals himself to Judge Holden as a government marshal, and the judge voices his opinion that Curtwright is the leader of the road agents, but voices it in the presence of his granddaughter, Louise Holden. The Judge doesn't know that Louise is in love with Curtwright, and she tips him off as to Johnnie's real identity. Curtwright frames Johnnie for a murder and arranges for the crooked sheriff to promote a lynching and Andy and Kitty help Johnnie escape jail. Johnnie rounds up vigilantes and heads for a showdown at the Bull Whip saloon.

Cast
 Jon Hall - Marshal Johnnie Taggart/'Ace' Braddock
 Margaret Lindsay - Kitty
 Andy Devine - Andy
 Paula Drew - Louise Holden
 Jack Lambert - Henchman Ben Borden
 Jonathan Hale - Judge Holden
 Robert Wilcox - Clay Curtwright
 Arthur Hohl - Sheriff
 Joan Shawlee - Ben's Girl (Joan Fulton)
 Lane Chandler - Messenger
 Wallace Scott - Bartender

References

External links
 

1947 films
1947 Western (genre) films
Universal Pictures films
American vigilante films
Cinecolor films
American Western (genre) films
Films directed by Ray Taylor
1940s American films